Pontycymmer Rugby Football Club are a Welsh rugby union club based in Pontycymer near Bridgend, Wales. The club is a member of the Welsh Rugby Union and is also a feeder club for the Ospreys.

Club honours
 WRU Division Six Central 1999/2000 - Champions
 WRU Division Four South East 2003/04 - Champions

Notable former players
 Hopkin Maddock (6 caps)

References 

Welsh rugby union teams
Rugby clubs established in 1887